Kentucky Route 290 (KY 290) is a  north–south road in Jackson County, Kentucky. Its south end is in Annville on KY 3630 and the north end is in Downtown McKee on US 421.

Route description
KY 290 begins at an intersection with KY 3630 in Annville, heading north on a two-lane undivided road. The route heads through a mix of farmland and woodland, coming to an intersection with the northern terminus of KY 578. A short distance later, the road intersects KY 2003. KY 290 continues through more rural areas, heading into the Daniel Boone National Forest. After passing through several miles of dense forest, the route heads into McKee and reaches its northern terminus at an intersection with US 421 in the downtown area.

Major intersections

References

Transportation in Jackson County, Kentucky
0290